Marjorie Franklin is an American conceptual artist and a Professor of Conceptual Art at University of Minnesota in the U.S.A. She uses digital media in interactive installations. Previously, she has worked on CD-ROMs such as "Digital Blood", an interactive narrative comparing two mothers who create an artificial life construct and "She Loves It, She Loves It Not:Women and Technology" (a collaboration with Paul Tompkins, the late Christine Tamblyn and others). In the interactive computer audio and video installations she creates her work focuses on the implications of the culture of computer technology for humans living in industrialised countries.

Christine Tamblyn once mentioned in a review that Franklin had been influenced by the Cyborg theory of Donna Haraway.

References

External links
 Marjorie Franklin's biography, bibliography and list of notable work at Marjorie Franklin dot com
 Marjorie Franklin at UCLA
 Mortal Coil
 The Minnesota Daily: Prof plugs seductiveness of cyber art
 Digital Blood
 "She Loves It, She Loves It Not: Women and Technology"

Living people
American artists
New media
Year of birth missing (living people)